The Military Music Museum was established in a building, that belonged to a local garrison, and was built in 1914. The red-brick building was used as storage for bicycles in 1993 and it was repaired for use as a museum with the help of the European union structural funds in 2003, according to architect Jouko Mattila.

The collections are related to the history of Finnish military music. There are also audio samples and photographs presented. Apart from the regular exhibition there are special ones for seasonal themes. Also lectures are given in the military museum and park concerts on the yard of the museum on summer time about two times a month.

The Military Medicine Museum (Sotilaslääketieteen museo) is nearby.

See also 
 List of music museums

References

Military music
Finnish military bands
Military and war museums in Finland
Museums established in 2003
Lahti
Museums in Päijät-Häme